Broken Bow High School may refer to:

Broken Bow High School (Broken Bow, Nebraska)
Broken Bow High School (Broken Bow, Oklahoma), Broken Bow, Oklahoma